Matthew Schissler is an American business executive who has served in leadership roles in a number of privately  and publicly held companies. He's most notable for having founded and managed Cord Blood America, Inc. (CBAI), a company specializing in the harvesting and storage of umbilical stem cells in the U.S. and worldwide. He currently manages a private investment fund focused on micro-cap public companies exhibiting significant growth potential.  Matthew Schissler is notably a Founder and Member of GHS Investments, LLC

Education
Schissler holds a degree in Biology and Public Policy from St. Mary’s College of Maryland.

Professional roles

Rainmakers International
From 2001 to 2003, Schissler founded and served as the president and CEO of the advertising agency RainMakers International. Based in Tampa, RainMakers was direct marketing agency for TV, radio and the web that also specialized in placing salespeople in contract and permanent positions. In 2008, the agency brokered a deal between Microsoft and the Michael Waltrip NASCAR Racing team to make Microsoft small business a sponsor for Michael McDowell's #00 car, in a deal where Microsoft's small business clients and resellers paid for the sponsor placement.

CBAI and subsidiaries
In 2003 Schissler founded Cord Blood America, Inc. (CBAI), a company specializing in harvesting and storing stem cells in the U.S. and abroad, serving as the company's chairman of the board and CEO until 2012. Parents who subscribe to CBAI supply the company with a small amount of blood taken from the umbilical cord at the birth of a child, which the company stores in the event that the family may need it as the result of a medical condition that could benefit from a stem cell treatment. At the time, he also served as CEO and chairmen of the board for Cord Partners Inc., CBAI's original stem storage company, which was absorbed by CBAI in 2005.

In 2006, CBAI purchased the assets of the Cryobank for Oncologic and Reproductive Donors (CORD), a bank in Middletown, New York, with inventory of 750 donors. In 2007, the company acquired Philadelphia-based CorCell Inc., at the time the fourth-largest umbilical cord blood bank in America. The same year, the company acquired CureSource, a Charleston-based cord blood storage facility that serviced about 340 customers. CorCell maintained its presence and name as CorCell Inc., a subsidiary of the parent company CBAI, being responsible for cord blood storage facilities. Schissler served as CorCell Inc.'s chairman, CEO and president. In 2010, they acquired 51 percent of stellacure GmbH of Hamburg, at the time the third-largest cord blood banking service in Germany, as well as a majority ownership of BioCells Argentina.

In 2010, Schissler relocated the company to Las Vegas, citing multiple reasons, including his frequent travels to Las Vegas for trade conventions, business-friendly tax climates and the ability to have low-cost laboratory space near the airport. Schissler also served as the founder and president of China Stem Cells, Inc.,  a stem cell storage facility in northeast China. In 2011, CBAI acquired two cord blood companies based in Chicago - Reproductive Genetics Institute, Inc, and NeoCells.

GHS Investments
Schissler is a Founder and Managing Member of GHS Investments, LLC. Founded in 2015, GHS Investments, LLC is a privately held "super value" fund focused on small to mid-cap companies, with an investment focus on companies exhibiting significant growth potential.

Parallax Enterprises
Schissler served as the chief operating officer of Parallax Enterprises. Started by Dr. Jeffrey Woolford, Parallax has designed a tool for operating rooms known as Consolidated Healthcare and Resource Management System (CHaRM), a device based on a fighter pilot’s Heads-Up-Display (HUD), which gives everyone in a surgical suite access to critical information and procedure checklists.

Pyrenees Investments
Schissler is also the founder and managing partner of Pyrenees Investments. A microcap advisory firm, Pyrenees Investments helps companies with services that include cleaning up balance sheets and eliminating debt in order to become successful.

Affiliations
In 2011, Schissler was named chairman of the Biotech Committee for the Nevada Development Authority. He has also served on the board of advisors for the Las Vegas Science Festival and the board of directors for the Las Vegas Natural History Museum, and is a member of the Karma Foundation.

Awards
In 2008, Schissler was a finalist for the Ernst and Young Entrepreneur of the Year Award.

Education
Schissler holds a degree in Biology and Public Policy from St. Mary’s College of Maryland.

References

External links
Pyrenees Investments

Living people
American technology company founders
Businesspeople from Nevada
St. Mary's College of Maryland alumni
St. Mary's College of Maryland
Year of birth missing (living people)